= Stock company =

Stock company can refer to:

- Joint-stock company, a business entity which is owned by shareholders
- Stock company, a group of actors resident to a repertory theatre
